The French submarine Diane was the lead boat of the class of two submarines built for the French Navy during World War I.

On 11 February 1918, Diane suffered an internal explosion in the Bay of Biscay off La Pallice, Vendée, France, and sank with the loss of her entire crew of 43.

See also 
List of submarines of France

Notes

Bibliography

 

Ships built in France
1916 ships
World War I submarines of France
Maritime incidents in 1918
Lost submarines of France
Ships lost with all hands
Ships sunk by non-combat internal explosions
World War I shipwrecks in the Atlantic Ocean